Ajay Nishad is an Indian politician and the current member of parliament from Muzaffarpur. He won the 2014 and the 2019 general election being a Bharatiya Janata Party candidate. He is the son of former Minister Jai Narain Prasad Nishad. Nishad had earlier contested and lost two assembly elections as a Rashtriya Janata Dal candidate from Kurhani and Sahebganj constituencies respectively.

Election results

References

Living people
People from Hajipur
India MPs 2014–2019
Lok Sabha members from Bihar
1966 births
Bharatiya Janata Party politicians from Bihar
Babasaheb Bhimrao Ambedkar Bihar University alumni
India MPs 2019–present
Rashtriya Janata Dal politicians